CEJI – A Jewish Contribution to an Inclusive Europe (also known as CEJI) is a non-governmental organisation (NGO) based in Brussels, Belgium. Established in 1991, the organisation's areas of expertise include: education; inclusion and social cohesion; discrimination and xenophobia; hate speech and hate crime; media and digital literacy. It also provides anti-discrimination training to teachers, social workers and others. The organisation recently launched a series of online courses ('Facing Facts') on hate crimes with support from Google, Facebook and Twitter that provide 'tools to educators, activists and other professionals to identify and combat hate speech'.

Current work

Diversity Education 
CEJI has created education and training programmes, the aim of which is to "enhance appreciation of Europe’s diversity including Jews, Roma, Muslims, gays and lesbians, etc."
The current training programmes offered by CEJI, in a partnership entitled 'Belieforama', include: 
 Religious Diversity and Anti-Discrimination – foundation programme.
 Overcoming Antisemitism
 Overcoming Islamophobia
 Reconciling Religion, Gender and Sexual Orientation
 Confronting Discrimination: Facilitation Skills
 Confronting Discrimination: Taking Action

Engaging Jewish Communities 
In addition to its Overcoming Antisemitism programme, CEJI also runs a series of programmes specifically for the Jewish community:
 Facing Facts! aims to improve monitoring and recording of hate crimes throughout the European Union. The project standardizes criteria for comparable hate crime data collection and works to train civil society organisations to gather, analyze and report incidents of hate crime and hate speech, be they anti-Jewish, anti-Roma, anti-homosexual or other.

Advocacy 
CEJI's aim is to contribute to policy-making processes dealing with antisemitism, racism, xenophobia, discrimination and diversity education at the institutions of the European Union, the OSCE, the Council of Europe and within the wider spectrum of European organisations and networks active in these areas.

Related to this advocacy work is Facing Facts!, a project to improve monitoring and recording of hate crimes throughout the European Union by standardising criteria for comparable hate crime data collection. CEJI trains civil society organisations to gather, analyze and report incidents of hate crime and hate speech, be they anti-Jewish, anti-Roma, anti-homosexual or other.

Intercultural Dialogue 
Interfaith and intercultural dialogue are key aspects of CEJI's work. According to CEJI: "the dialogue approach is particularly pertinent to relations between Muslim and Jewish communities, which have been greatly affected by the volatile political climate of recent years". CEJI offers training courses in both 'Overcoming Antisemitism' and 'Overcoming Islamophobia', often run as a combined training course.

Partnerships 
CEJI partnership and membership organizations.

Partner organizations

CEJI memberships 

 European Network Against Racism (ENAR)
 European Network on Religion and Belief (ENORB)
 European Peer Training Organisation (EPTO)
 European Platform on Religious Intolerance and Discrimination (EPRID)
 International Network Against Cyber Hate

Funders

Publications 
 Facing Facts! Hate Crime Monitoring Guidelines
 Learning from Experience, Leading to Engagement Policy Document 
 Citizenship Education for Diversity: Guidelines & Considerations for Policy Makers and Practitioners

References

External links 
 CEJI – A Jewish Contribution to an Inclusive Europe website
 Belieforama website
 Facing Facts! website

International organisations based in Belgium
Political advocacy groups in Europe
Anti-racist organizations in Europe
Jewish organizations
Jewish anti-racism
Jewish organizations based in Europe
Opposition to antisemitism in Europe
Jewish political organizations
Civil liberties advocacy groups
International Jewish organizations